Pawo Tsuglag Threngwa (1504–1566), the second Nenang Pawo, was a Tibetan historian of the Karma Kagyu. He was a disciple of Mikyö Dorje, 8th Karmapa Lama. He was the author of the famous mkhas pa'i dga' ston, A Scholar's Feast, addressing history of Buddhism in India and its spread in Tibet, as well as the history of Tibet.

In 1565, a year before his death, he wrote a detailed commentary of the Bodhisattvacaryāvatāra.

His dharma histories were cited by the 4th Drikung Chetsang, Tenzin Peme Gyaltsen (1770–1826) in The Golden Garland of the Throne Lineage (Denrab Chöjung Serthreng, gdan rabs chos byung gser phreng).

Works 
 The Chojung Khepai Gaton, or Scholars Feast (chos 'byung khas pa'i dga' ston), a renowned Tibetan religious history of Buddhism in India and its diffusion in Tibet, with particular emphasis on the Karma Kagyu tradition.
 Works on history, medicine, astrology, general Buddhism
 Works in Worldcat

References

 Chos kyi 'byung gnas. 1990. Dpa' bo gnyis pa/ rgyal ba gtsug lag phreng ba. In Ta'i si tu pa kun mkhyen chos kyi 'byu gnas bstan pa'i nyin byed kyi bka' 'bum. Vol. 12, pp. 55–63. Sansal: Pelpung sungrab nyamso khang.
 Grags pa 'byungs gnas and Blo bzang mkhas grub. 1992. Gangs can mkhas sgrub rim byon ming mdzod. Lanzhou: Kan su'u mi rigs dpe skrun khang, pp. 995–996.
 Gtsug lag phreng ba. N.d. Dge slong gtsug lag phreng ba rang nyid kyi rtogs pa brjod pa 'khrul pa'i bzhin ras 'char ba'i me long.
 Mi nyag mgon po. 1996–2000. Dpa' bo gtsug lag phreng ba'i rnam thar mdor bsdus. In Gangs can mkhas dbang rim byon gyi rnam thar mdor bsdus, Vol. 1, pp. 237–242. Beijing: Krung go'i bod kyi shes rig dpe skrun khang.

External links 
 Pawo Tsuglag Threngwa, Index of Collected Works
 Samten Chhosphel, "Second Pawo, Tsuklak Trengwa," Treasury of Lives

Nenang Pawos
Tibetan historians
Karma Kagyu lamas
1504 births
1566 deaths